Cooranga is a rural locality in the Western Downs Region, Queensland, Australia.

Geography 
The Dalby–Jandowae Road runs along the western boundary.

History 
The locality was named and bounded on 14 September 2001, having been previously the neighbourhood of Cooranga North. The name Cooranga comes from a pastoral run name, which was probably taken from a creek name, reportedly a Kabi language word meaning war spear.

An extension of the Bell Branch railway line from Bell to Mount Mahen through Cooranga North was proposed by government in 1915 but never built.

Cooranga North State School opened on 2 February 1914 and closed on 14 July 2003. It was at 14 Cooranga North Niagara Road.

Nearby Mount Mahen Provisional School opened in 1925 and closed in 1929.   Children from the Hunter family formed most of the small enrolments recorded.

Our Lady of Sacred Heart Catholic Church opened on Sunday 11 September 1938 on land donated by Mrs Mary Gertrude O'Brien. It was at 152 Cooranga North Niagara Road. On 28 June 2017 in the middle of the night, the church building was relocated to St Thomas More College in Sunnybank, Brisbane, where it is used as the school's chapel.

Cooranga North Presbyterian Church opened on Saturday 20 June 1953; however, Presbyterian services had been held in private homes and other local venues since 1914.

Education 
There are no schools in Cooranga. The nearest primary schools are in Bell, Jandowae, and Jimbour. The nearest secondary schools are in Bell and Jandowae but these provide schooling only  to Year 10. For Years 11 and 12, the nearest secondary school is Dalby State High School.

Amenities 

The Cooranga North branch of the Queensland Country Women's Association meets at the Cooranga North Memorial Hall at 41 Cooranga North Niagara Road.

Cooranga North Presbyterian Church is at 112 Cooranga North Niagara Road.

References

External links

Western Downs Region
Localities in Queensland